Mississauga—Lakeshore (formerly Mississauga South) is a federal electoral district in Peel Region, Ontario, Canada. It has been represented in the House of Commons of Canada since 1979.

Geography
The riding includes the Mississauga neighbourhoods of Clarkson, Lakeview, Lorne Park, Mineola, Port Credit, Sheridan, Sheridan Park, Southdown and parts of Erindale and Cooksville.

Demographics
According to the Canada 2021 Census

Ethnic groups: 63.7% White, 10.1% South Asian, 5.1% Chinese, 4.9% Black, 3.3% Arab, 3.3% Filipino, 1.9% Latin American, 1.5% Southeast Asian, 1.3% Indigenous, 1.2% West Asian
Languages: 65.5% English, 4.1% Polish, 2.4% Mandarin, 2.4% Arabic, 2.2% Portuguese, 2.0% Urdu, 1.9% French, 1.9% Spanish, 1.8% Italian, 1.5% Tagalog, 1.3% Serbo-Croatian 
Religions: 58.5% Christian (34.8% Catholic, 3.9% Anglican, 3.6% Christian Orthodox, 3.3% United Church, 1.4% Presbyterian, 1.1% Baptist, 11.6% Others), 8.9% Muslim, 3.1% Hindu, 1.1% Buddhist, 26.4% No religion 
Median income (2020): $45,600 
Average income (2020): $73,900

Political geography
Conservative support is centred in the central part of the riding, particularly in the upscale Lorne Park and Mineola areas, while the Liberals tend to do better along the waterfront of the riding, such as Port Credit and Lakeview, and the eastern and western edges of the riding in neighbourhoods like Clarkson and Sheridan.

History
The federal riding was created in 1976 from parts of Mississauga.

It consisted initially of the part of the City of Mississauga lying south of a line drawn from west to east along Highway 5 (Dundas Street), south along Cawthra Road, and east along the Queen Elizabeth Way.

In 1987, it was redefined to consist of the part of the City of Mississauga lying south of a line drawn from southwest to northeast along Dundas Street West, east along the Credit River, northeast along the Queen Elizabeth Way, northwest along Cawthra Road, and northeast along the Queensway East to the eastern city limit.

In 1996, it was redefined to consist of the part of the City of Mississauga lying south of a line drawn from southwest to northeast along Dundas Street West, southeast along Erin Mills Parkway, northeast along the Queen Elizabeth Way, northwest along Hurontario Street, northeast along the Queensway East to the northeastern city limit.

In 2003, it was given its current boundaries as described above.

In 2013, the riding gained the area around Huron Park, and was renamed Mississauga—Lakeshore. It was defined to consist of the part of the City of Mississauga lying southeast of a line drawn from northeast to southwest along the Queensway to Mavis Road, north along Mavis Road until Dundas Street and west along Dundas Street to the southwestern city limit.

Since the 2015 Canadian Federal election, the Liberal Party of Canada has succeeded in holding Mississauga—Lakeshore as they have done in 2015, 2019 and 2021 elections with significant margins over 45%. This trend is aligned with the continued Liberal Party of Canada's dominance of Greater Toronto Area politics and seats.

Electoral history

The Mississauga South riding and its precursors, while being more competitive than in provincial elections, still has a generally conservative history, and despite voting Liberal since 1993, could be described as a small "c" conservative riding. The Progressive Conservatives held the riding from creation its first election in 1979 under Don Blenkarn, (who served as MP for Peel South, one of the precursor ridings between 1972 and 1974), until 1993, when he was defeated by Paul Szabo. With the exception of the 1988 election, Szabo has been the Liberal candidate in all election between 1980 (an election he almost won) and 2011.

The riding voting Liberal in 1993 can in part be blamed by vote-splitting on the right, as Blenkarn was knocked into third place by the Reform Party candidate, although both were far behind Szabo, who only marginally improved on the Liberal performance from 1988, winning 37%, only 2% more than the 1988 Liberal result, and less than the combined vote total for the two right-wing parties. Szabo however greatly increased his percentage of the vote in the elections afterward, winning over 50% in every election from 1997 to 2004, despite facing a united right-wing vote in 2004.

In the 2006 election Szabo and the Liberals were re-elected again; however, the Liberal vote dropped sharply, with the Conservatives coming within 5% of winning the riding, getting 40% of the vote, one of the best performances for them in the Greater Toronto Area. The riding was generally assumed to be a top Tory target for the next election; however, the drawn-out and somewhat acrimonious nature of the Conservative nomination process, and Szabo's increased profile as a result of his chairmanship of the House of Commons Ethics committee may have damaged Conservative attempts to capture the riding. Despite the Conservatives strengthening in the 2008 election overall, Arrison was unable to defeat Szabo, and Mississauga South was one of the few ridings outside Quebec where the Liberal Party increased the percentage of the vote received from 2006 (albeit very slightly).

From 2011 to 2015 the riding was held by the Conservatives, however, starting in 2015 as a part of the overall Liberal dominance of Greater Toronto Area seats and ridings, the riding has gone and stayed Liberal. Incumbent Sven Spengemann defeated Conservative Stella Ambler in 2015 and 2019 and Conservative challenger Michael Ras in the 2021 snap election.

In May 2022, Spengemann announced his resignation in order to accept a position with the United Nations, prompting a by-election. Throughout the summer the Conservatives nominated Peel Police officer and gang prevention expert Ron Chhinzer, the NDP put forward Julia Kole - a party staffer, and the Greens nominated Mary Kidnew - a climate activist. 

By November the Liberals nominated Charles Sousa, former Ontario Finance Minister (2013-2018) and MPP for Mississauga-Lakeshore (2007-2018), and by the following days, Prime Minister Justin Trudeau called the by-election (November 12) for an election day of December 12.

Sousa won the by-election soundly on Monday, December 12, 2022, capturing just over 51% of the vote which is the highest Liberal vote share in Mississauga-Lakeshore in years. The Conservatives trailed with 37% of the vote with the NDP and Greens collecting last than 5% of the vote, respectively.

Riding associations

Riding associations are the local branches of political parties:

Members of Parliament
This riding has elected the following members of the House of Commons of Canada:

Election results

Mississauga—Lakeshore (2013-present)

Mississauga South (1976-2013)

			

Note: Conservative vote is compared to the total of the Canadian Alliance vote and Progressive Conservative vote in 2000 election. Change is based on redistributed results.

Note: Canadian Alliance vote is compared to the Reform vote in 1997 election.

See also

 List of Canadian federal electoral districts
 Past Canadian electoral districts

References

federal riding history from the Library of Parliament
 2011 Results from Elections Canada
 Campaign expense data from Elections Canada

Notes

External links
 Tom Simpson's Campaign for the Conservative Nomination in Mississauga South
 Paul Simas, Green Party of Canada Candidate in Mississauga South
 Green Party of Canada electoral district association for Mississauga South

Ontario federal electoral districts
Politics of Mississauga
1976 establishments in Ontario